Černá may refer to:

 Černá, Semily District, a village near Lomnice nad Popelkou, Czech Republic
 Černá (Žďár nad Sázavou District), a village in the Czech Republic
 Černá v Pošumaví, a village in South Bohemia, Czech Republic
 Černá u Bohdanče, a village near Pardubice, Czech Republic
 Černá (river), a Czech and German river, also known as Schwarzwasser
 Černá (surname), a Czech surname, feminine form of Černý

See also
 Cerna (disambiguation)
 Czerna (disambiguation)
 Crna (disambiguation)